Beamsville District Secondary School is a secondary school in Beamsville, Ontario, Canada.

History
BDSS has established a long tradition of excellence dating back to 1888, when the very first classes were conducted. Since that time BDSS has continued to offer a wealth of choice in areas of academics, sports and club activities. Academic studies include classes in English, French, Geography, History, Mathematics and Science. Students can also choose from a variety of classes including: the Arts (Music, Art, Drama), Business and Computer Studies, Family Studies, Physical Education and Technological Studies (Transportation, Construction, Electrical, Welding, Manufacturing, Design, Communications, and Horticulture.)

The original building of 1888 was where Jacob Beam public school sits on King St. West at William St. Today the school consists of 3 separate buildings. Wing 1, constructed in 1917 with additions in 1924 and 1963. Wing 2 was constructed in 1958 and Wing 3 was built in 1963. Wing 3 is home to labs, technology shops, and the large second gym. Although designed as free standing structures, the three wings are interconnected by an elevated walkway between Wing 1 and Wing 2.

The 1917 component of the school was designed by noted architect Walter William LaChance, who had written two books on school architecture. He also wrote an article in an architectural magazine about his design for this school.

The teaching staff consists of 60 full-time employees, one principal, one vice-principal and part-time vice-principal. The support staff includes secretaries, educational assistants and caretakers. The school also has a full service cafeteria that serves breakfast as well as lunch.

In the fall of 2002, the high school started a $6.5 million renovation and rebuilding project. One of the most visible renovations was the creation of a front entrance for the school. The new entrance provides a front foyer and new, better functioning office space. The front steps to the building, which were covered over more than 69 years ago, are uncovered and refurbished, now drawing one's eyes up to the massive pillars of the original building. Less visible is the much larger renovation to infrastructure such as electrical, plumbing, heating and ventilation systems which improve both the safety and comfort of the school, as well as a new sprung hardwood gym floor in the large gym. Other notable renovations are evident in the original gymnasium and performance area, as well as in classes such as the welding shop.

The school was designated as a heritage property by the town of Lincoln on September 18, 2017.

Notable alumni 
 George Hudson, Canadian Football League player
 Tonya Verbeek, Olympic wrestler
 Neil Peart, drummer from Rush
 Anthony Partridge, TV presenter/actor Goblin Works Garage

Planned closure
On March 28, 2017, the District School Board of Niagara (DSBN) voted in favour of a motion to close three high schools, including Beamsville District Secondary School, in favour of a single large high school to be constructed at a yet-to-be-determined location.  Under the current plan, Beamsville District Secondary School will close in 2020 following the 2019–2020 school year, and the new amalgamated high school will open in September 2020.

Opposition to planned closure
Many groups have been vocal in opposing the closure and amalgamation plans.  The Town of Grimsby, as well as the Town of Lincoln, have both passed motions voicing opposition.  Niagara West-Glanbrook Member of Provincial Parliament Sam Oosterhoff, himself a recent high school graduate, has also voiced opposition to the amalgamation plans, and has spoken in the Ontario Legislative Assembly in favour of a moratorium on school closures.  On Wednesday, March 29, students at South Lincoln High School walked out of class in protest over the closure and amalgamation plans (which affect South Lincoln High School as well as Grimsby Secondary School and Beamsville District Secondary School).

See also
List of high schools in Ontario

References 

High schools in the Regional Municipality of Niagara
1888 establishments in Ontario
Educational institutions established in 1888
Designated heritage properties in Ontario